Rivière aux Ormes may refer to:

 Rivière aux Ormes (Petite rivière du Chêne), Quebec, Canada
 Rivière aux Ormes (Huron River tributary), Quebec, Canada